Tony Garcy (born June 20, 1939) is an American former weightlifter. He competed in the men's lightweight event at the 1964 Summer Olympics.

References

External links
 

1939 births
Living people
Sportspeople from the Phoenix metropolitan area
American male weightlifters
Olympic weightlifters of the United States
Weightlifters at the 1964 Summer Olympics
Pan American Games medalists in weightlifting
Pan American Games gold medalists for the United States
Weightlifters at the 1963 Pan American Games
20th-century American people
21st-century American people